Paulo "Macamito" Macamo (born 7 September 1974) is a Mozambican footballer currently playing for Maxaquene.His position is Midfielder.

See also 
Football in Mozambique
List of football clubs in Mozambique

References

External links

1974 births
Living people
Mozambique international footballers
Mozambican footballers
Association football midfielders
Place of birth missing (living people)